Tim Dieck (born 7 April 1996) is a German competitive ice dancer. With his former skating partner Katharina Müller, he is a two-time German national champion and has won many senior international medals, including two silver medals on the ISU Challenger Series and three gold medals at the German NRW Trophy. They have represented Germany at the European and World championships. In December 2022, it was announced that Dieck had teamed up with British-Spanish ice dancer Olivia Smart.

Personal life 
Tim Dieck was born on 7 April 1996 in Dortmund, Germany. His parents, Martina and Frieder, are involved in figure skating as a coach and judge, respectively, and his sister, Dominique, formerly competed in ice dancing. As of 2017, he is studying sports science at Ruhr University Bochum. He is a soldier-athlete in the Bundeswehr.

Career

Early career 
Dieck started skating in 2000 and took up ice dancing in 2011. He skated with Dana Wehner in the 2011–12 season. They placed ninth at the 2012 German Junior Championships.

In 2012–13, Dieck began competing with Florence Clarke. They were fifth at the 2013 German Junior Championships. The following season, they debuted on the ISU Junior Grand Prix series, finishing ninth in Riga, Latvia and fifteenth in Gdańsk, Poland. They were also assigned to the 2014 World Junior Championships in Sofia, Bulgaria, but were eliminated after placing twenty-seventh in the short dance. Clarke decided to retire at the end of the season.

2014–15 season 
Vitali Schulz arranged a tryout between Dieck and Katharina Müller. They teamed up in April 2014, coached by Schulz und James Young in Dortmund. Assigned to two Junior Grand Prix events, they placed eighth in Ljubljana, Slovenia, and seventh in Aichi, Japan. After winning the 2015 German junior national title, they were sent to the 2015 World Junior Championships in Tallinn, Estonia; ranked thirteenth in the short dance, they qualified for the final segment and finished twelfth overall.

2015–16 season 
Competing in the Challenger Series (CS), Müller/Dieck finished tenth in September at the 2015 Nebelhorn Trophy – their first senior international – and eighth the following month at the 2015 Mordovian Ornament. In November, they won bronze at the 2015 NRW Trophy before appearing at their third CS event, the 2015 Tallinn Trophy, where they placed fifth. They were awarded the silver medal at the German Championships in December, having finished second to Lorenz/Polizoakis, and took bronze at the Toruń Cup. Müller/Dieck were included in Germany's team to the 2016 European Championships in Bratislava, Slovakia, but were eliminated after placing twenty-third in the short dance.

In spring 2016, Müller/Dieck began training under Marina Zueva in Canton, Michigan, in addition to Schulz and Young in Dortmund.

2016–17 season 
Müller/Dieck competed at two Challenger events, placing twelfth at the 2016 CS U.S. Classic and ninth at the 2016 CS Nebelhorn Trophy. They won gold at the NRW Trophy for the first time, and were the German national silver medalists for the second consecutive year.

2017–18 season 
Competing three times on the Challenger series, Müller/Dieck were fifth at the 2017 CS Warsaw Cup, sixth at the 2017 CS Ice Star, and eleventh at the 2017 CS Golden Spin of Zagreb.  They won the silver medal at the German championships for the third consecutive year.

2018–19 season 
Again competing on the Challenger series three times, Müller/Dieck were seventh at both the 2018 CS Nebelhorn Trophy and the 2018 CS Golden Spin of Zagreb and ninth at the 2018 CS Ondrej Nepela Trophy.  They were invited to make their Grand Prix debut, placing seventh at the 2018 Skate America and tenth at the 2018 Grand Prix of Helsinki.  NRW Trophy champions for the second time, they then won their fourth consecutive silver medal at the German championships.

2019–20 season 
Müller/Dieck's three Challenger competitions for the year were the 2019 CS Ondrej Nepela Memorial, the 2019 CS Ice Star and the 2019 CS Golden Spin of Zagreb, where they placed eighth, sixth and sixth, respectively. They did not return to the Grand Prix, but won the inaugural Denis Ten Memorial Challenge and the Open d'Andorra, followed by becoming German national champions for the first time.  

Müller/Dieck attended the European Championships for the first time in four seasons, placing thirteenth. They were supposed to make their World Championship debut at the 2020 edition in Montreal, but these were cancelled as a result of the COVID-19 pandemic.

2020–21 season 
Despite the continued limitations of the pandemic on international competition, Müller/Dieck won their first Challenger medal, a silver at the 2020 CS Budapest Trophy, as well as their third gold medal at the NRW Trophy.  Repeating as German national champions, they went on to make their World Championship debut at the 2021 World Championships in Stockholm, where they came in eighteenth. This result qualified a berth for a German ice dance team at the 2022 Winter Olympics in Beijing.

2021–22 season 
Müller/Dieck began the season at the 2021 CS Nebelhorn Trophy, winning the silver medal. Dieck noted that it was "always special to win a medal in Germany," while Müller said, "we were not competing for an Olympic spot here, but it was important to us for our national qualification and to prove that we are ready and want to go to the Olympic Games." They came ninth at the 2021 CS Finlandia Trophy.

Initially assigned to the 2021 Cup of China on the Grand Prix, upon its cancellation Müller/Dieck were reassigned to the 2021 Gran Premio d'Italia. They finished in eighth place. They were sixth at the 2021 CS Cup of Austria and second at the Open d'Andorra.

Despite losing the German national title to rivals Janse van Rensburg/Steffan, Müller/Dieck were named to the German Olympic team. They first competed at the 2022 European Championships, finishing in twelfth place.

Müller/Dieck began the 2022 Winter Olympics as the German entries in the rhythm dance segment of the Olympic team event, where they finished tenth among ten. In the dance event, they were twenty-first in the rhythm dance, missing the cut for the free dance.

The team encountered new difficulties following the Olympics, as Vladimir Putin's invasion of Ukraine and resultant tensions between Russia and Germany resulted in their being unable to return to their Moscow training location. Dieck and Müller later separated, and Dieck teamed up with Olivia Smart to skate for Germany. From April 2023, they hope to prepare for the 2023–2024 season in Montreal.

Programs

With Müller

With Clarke

Competitive highlights 
GP: Grand Prix; CS: Challenger Series; JGP: Junior Grand Prix

With Müller

With Clarke

With Wehner

References

External links 
 
 

1996 births
German male ice dancers
Living people
Sportspeople from Dortmund
Competitors at the 2017 Winter Universiade
Competitors at the 2019 Winter Universiade
Figure skaters at the 2022 Winter Olympics
Olympic figure skaters of Germany